Ziętek  is a village in the administrative district of Gmina Krupski Młyn, within Tarnowskie Góry County, Silesian Voivodeship, in southern Poland.

References

Villages in Tarnowskie Góry County